Pál Bakos (born 1932) is a Hungarian rower. He competed at the 1952 Summer Olympics in Helsinki with the men's eight where they were eliminated in the semi-finals repêchage.

References

1932 births
Living people
Hungarian male rowers
Olympic rowers of Hungary
Rowers at the 1952 Summer Olympics
European Rowing Championships medalists